The Finnish national road 23 is a highway between Western and Eastern Finland that runs between the cities of Pori and Joensuu via Jyväskylä. The road is also called the Finnish Lake Road, as it runs through the Finnish Lakeland area in the central hinterland of the country.

The road is almost entirely two-lane, except for the motorway section shared with Highways 4, 9 and 13 in the Jyväskylä sub-region, the short four-lane section located in the center of Varkaus and the motorway section common to Highway 9 in Joensuu. The road has been built over decades in several different parts, and its quality varies significantly. For most of the current highway route, the road was completely absent before the main sections were built mainly in the 1960s and 1970s. Highway 23 road came at the turn of the 1970s and 1980s.

Route 

The road passes through the following municipalities, localities in brackets:

Pori-Pomarkku–Kankaanpää–Jämijärvi–Parkano–Ikaalinen–Parkano (again)–Kihniö–Virrat–Keuruu–Petäjävesi–Jyväskylä–Laukaa–Hankasalmi–Pieksämäki–Joroinen–Pieksämäki (again)–Joroinen (again)–Pieksämäki (again)–Joroinen (again)–Varkaus–Leppävirta–Heinävesi–Leppävirta (again)–Heinävesi (again)–Liperi–Joensuu.

See also
 Finnish national road 13

Sources

References

External links

Roads in Finland
Transport in Jyväskylä